José Luis Ceballos (born February 23, 1953 in Córdoba, Argentina) is a former Argentine footballer who played for clubs in Argentina, Chile, Mexico and Spain. He played for Argentina at the 1975 Pan American Games.

Teams
  Instituto de Córdoba 1973
  Belgrano de Córdoba 1974
  San Lorenzo 1975
  Atlanta 1976
  Everton 1976–1978
  Cruz Azul 1978–1980
  Las Palmas 1980–1981
  San Lorenzo 1981
  Toros Neza 1981–1982
  Puebla 1982–1984
  Atlas 1984–1985

Titles
  Everton 1976 (Chilean Primera División Championship)
  Cruz Azul 1978–1979 and 1979–1980 (Primera División de México Championship)

References

External links
 

1953 births
Living people
Argentine footballers
Footballers from Córdoba, Argentina
Association football forwards
Argentine expatriate footballers
Club Atlético Belgrano footballers
San Lorenzo de Almagro footballers
Club Atlético Atlanta footballers
Cruz Azul footballers
Club Puebla players
Atlas F.C. footballers
Instituto footballers
Everton de Viña del Mar footballers
Chilean Primera División players
Argentine Primera División players
Liga MX players
Expatriate footballers in Chile
Expatriate footballers in Mexico
Expatriate footballers in Spain
Toros Neza footballers
Pan American Games bronze medalists for Argentina
Pan American Games medalists in football
Footballers at the 1975 Pan American Games
Medalists at the 1975 Pan American Games